Taxi-Kitty is a 1950 West German musical comedy film directed by Kurt Hoffmann and starring Hannelore Schroth, Carl Raddatz and Fita Benkhoff. The film was made at the Bendestorf Studios. The film's sets were designed by the art director Franz Schroedter. It was partly shot in Hamburg.

Synopsis
In Hamburg, an out-of-work singer gets a job selling refreshments in a canteen for taxi drivers. When she gets her big break as a singer, she turns it down to marry one of the drivers.

Cast
 Hannelore Schroth as Kitty Grille
 Carl Raddatz as Charly
 Fita Benkhoff as Elvira Rembrandt
 Karl Schönböck as Molander
 Hans Schwarz Jr. as Barsch
 Clown Nuk as himself
 Inge Meysel as 1. Sekretärin
 Gunnar Möller as Boy
 Alexander Hunzinger
 Gustl Busch as Frau Körner
 Susanne Feldmann as 2. Sekretärin

References

Bibliography 
 Hans-Michael Bock and Tim Bergfelder. The Concise Cinegraph: An Encyclopedia of German Cinema. Berghahn Books, 2009.

External links 
 

1950 films
1950 musical comedy films
German musical comedy films
West German films
1950s German-language films
Films directed by Kurt Hoffmann
German black-and-white films
1950s German films